Warren R. Ward (born 25 May 1962) is an English former professional footballer who scored 14 goals from 39 games in the Football League playing as a forward for York City, Lincoln City and Exeter City.

Career
Ward was born in Plymstock, Devon.  He began his football career as a junior with Yorkshire Amateurs and played for Guiseley before making his debut in the Football League with York City. He also played in the League with Lincoln City, where he was joint top scorer alongside Neil Redfearn – with only 8 goals – in the 1985–86 season, which included a loan spell at Exeter City. He then moved into non-League football with Boston United, King's Lynn, Spalding United, Lincoln United, Grantham Town, where he was for a time player-manager, Boston Town and Wisbech Town. He went on to coach with the Lincolnshire Football Association.

References

1962 births
Living people
People from Plymstock
English footballers
Association football forwards
Yorkshire Amateur A.F.C. players
Guiseley A.F.C. players
York City F.C. players
Lincoln City F.C. players
Exeter City F.C. players
Boston United F.C. players
King's Lynn F.C. players
Spalding United F.C. players
Lincoln United F.C. players
Grantham Town F.C. players
Boston Town F.C. players
Wisbech Town F.C. players
English Football League players
Southern Football League players
English football managers
Grantham Town F.C. managers